The Beast of the Earth, also called "The Dabba/Dabbah" is a creature mentioned in the Quran Surah 27:82 of the Quran and associated with Judgement Day. For this reason, the Beast of the Earth is often mentioned in eschatological writings as a sign of Judgement Day close to the event of the sun rising in the west. The Quran doesn't offer details about the nature of the Beast of the Earth, but various interpretations have linked it to the The Beast (Revelation) or monsters from Turkic mythology.

Quran and Hadiths 
The Beast is mentioned in Surah An-Naml):

In hadiths, the Beast of the Earth is further described. It is said that it will carry the Seal of Solomon and the Staff of Moses. Some argue that it will emerge from a crack in the Kaaba or the hills of Safa among others. It is desribed as a combination of different beasts and animals.

In the early period of Islam descriptions of the Beast of the Earth were sparse. Only later more interpretations of the Beast emerged. One of the main features is that it will put a seal to distinguish the believers from the disbelievers, reminiscent, yet not identical, to the Bible. In reference to a creature "worse of the beasts" ("shara al dawabbi"), due to their spiritual inablity to hear and see despite their physical ability to do so, it was interpreted as embodiment of attachment to the material world, sharing similarities with Central Asia mythological creatures, likewise composed of several parts of animals and symbolizes the material world.

Interpretations

Traditional
According to the medieval Sunni theologian Fakhr al-Din al-Razi, there is nothing mentioned in hadith reports attributed to the Islamic prophet Muhammad about the nature of this creature, but it is mentioned in narrations circulating around the time of his successors. Wahb ibn Munabbih stated that such a "beast" spoke to the people of Sodom from under the earth.

Contemporary
While the majority of contemporary Islamic scholars accept the traditional exegesis of the Beast of the Earth, the Dābbat al-Arḍ as a literal creature who will appear in the end times, some interpret the Beast as possibly being made of various parts, including diseases like HIV. Another interpretation holds that this Beast is related to materialistic tendencies, and thus the Dābbat does not appear at the end of the world, but rather will doom a given nation or society.

See also
 The Beast (Revelation)
 Chimera (mythology)

References

Islamic eschatology
Islamic legendary creatures
Islamic terminology
Quranic figures